Tuesday Morning Corporation is an American household merchandise discount store headquartered in Dallas, Texas. Founded in 1974, the company advertises nearly 500 locations across the country and advertises itself as having high quality products at low prices.

History
Tuesday Morning was established in 1974 by Lloyd Ross. Ross worked with manufacturers to buy their excess merchandise and host limited-time warehouse sales to offer these goods at a discount to the public. The company moved to a pop-up retail location in 1979 with seasonal events. The company went to full-time retail operations in 1979 and went public in 1984 with 57 stores. At its peak in 2018, the company operated over 700 locations and had sales of over $1 billion. Tuesday Morning focuses on discount home goods.

In May 2020, after extended store closures due to the COVID-19 pandemic, the company filed for Chapter 11 bankruptcy reorganization and was delisted from the American Stock Exchange. During the reorganization process the company closed close to 200 unprofitable store locations and a distribution center.

In December 2020, the company emerged from bankruptcy with a rights offering, enabling the ability to pay all vendor claims in full and protect shareholder value.  Upon emerging, the company established a new executive leadership team who has failed to live up to expectations and tanked the companies stock from $4+ per share down to .30 cents per share in just over one years time. On May 25, 2021, the company was re-listed on the Nasdaq stock exchange under TUEM.

On February 14, 2023, Tuesday Morning once again filed for Chapter 11 bankruptcy; the company then proceeded to close roughly half of all stores nationwide, including nearly all of its stores in California.

References

External links

Madison Dearborn Partners companies
Discount stores of the United States
American companies established in 1974
Retail companies established in 1974
Companies based in Dallas
Companies formerly listed on the Nasdaq
Companies traded over-the-counter in the United States
Companies that filed for Chapter 11 bankruptcy in 2020
Companies that filed for Chapter 11 bankruptcy in 2023
1974 establishments in Texas